The Rocketdyne AR2, also known by the military designation LR42, was a family of liquid-fuelled rocket engines designed and produced in the United States (US) during the 1950s and 1960s.

Design and development
The Rocketdyne division of North American Aviation developed a relatively small liquid-fuelled rocket engine for thrust augmentation of manned aircraft during the late 1950s. The AR2 is a single-chamber rocket engine burning kerosene (JP-4 or JP-5) jet fuel, oxidised with 90% High Test Peroxide (H2O2 / HTP), allowing the engine to use the same fuel as an aircraft fuel system. The variable-thrust AR2 is a direct development of the fixed thrust AR1, which was given the military designation LR36.

The AR2-3 had variable-thrust and single lever throttle control, regulating flow of oxidiser to the turbo-pump gas-generator and thus flow of propellants to the combustion chamber.

Operational history

Variants
AR-1 (YLR36-NA-2) Initial fixed-thrust variant.
AR2-1 (YLR42-NA-2) prototype, test and development variable-thrust engines.
AR2-2test and development engines.
AR2-3Production engines for research and development projects like the NF-104A.

Applications
North American F-86F(R)
Lockheed NF-104A

Specifications (AR2-3)

References

Rocket engines of the United States
Aircraft rocket engines
Rocket engines using the gas-generator cycle
Rocketdyne engines